Kfar Ruth is an Israeli settlement organised as a moshav. It was established in 1977 in an area that had become a no-man's land between Israel and Jordanian-controlled West Bank at the end of the 1948 Arab–Israeli War, before becoming part of the Israeli-occupied territories in the 1967 Six-Day War.

History
The settlement was established in 1977 and was named after the ancient village of Capheruta that appears on the Madaba Map. Capheruta is identified with the adjacent Khirbet Kafr Lut. Prior to the 1948 Arab–Israeli War some of the land had belonged to the Palestinian village of al-Burj, which was depopulated in the war. According to ARIJ, after the Six-Day War, Israel confiscated 814 dunams of land from the Palestinian village of Saffa for the construction of Kfar Ruth.

Economy
According to archeologists, grapes were grown in the region by the inhabitants of Modi'in.  Tal Maor, a resident of Kfar Ruth, has revived the age-old tradition of winemaking through the establishment of a family winery, Ruth Vineyard.

References

External links
Official website

Moshavim
Populated places established in 1977
1977 establishments in Asia
Populated places in Central District (Israel)
Israeli settlements